The Household Waste Recycling Act 2003 (c 29) is an Act of the Parliament of the United Kingdom.

It has been suggested that this Act should be amended to increase the number of recyclable items that collection authorities must collect from households to at least seven.

Section 5 - Short title, commencement and extent
Section 5(2) provides that the Act came into force at the end of the period of two months that began on the date on which it was passed. The word "months" means calendar months. The day (that is to say, 30 October 2003) on which the Act was passed (that is to say, received royal assent) is included in the period of two months. This means that the Act came into force on 30 December 2003.

References
Halsbury's Statutes,

External links
The Household Waste Recycling Act 2003, as amended from the National Archives.
The Household Waste Recycling Act 2003, as originally enacted from the National Archives.

United Kingdom Acts of Parliament 2003